Tony Friel (born in Birkenhead, Wirral, Cheshire, 4 May 1958) is an English bass guitarist, known for his role in different new wave bands.

He attended Heys Boys Secondary School, where he met Martin Bramah and attained an art O-Level. He and Bramah shared many interests. In the mid-1970s, they were introduced by their friend Barbara Smith to her brother Mark E. Smith and his friend Una Baines. Smith, Baines, Bramah and Friel shared interests in music, and formed their first band, the Fall. Friel remained until December 1977, then he left.

After the Fall, Friel formed a project called Contact and a band called the Passage. In late 1978, he and his former Fall bandmate Karl Burns joined the Teardrops, a group which included Buzzcocks bassist Steve Garvey. They released the Leave Me No Choice EP, and in 1980, the Final Vinyl album, before breaking up.

In subsequent years Friel played with R&B bands. Later he was member of the Woodbank Streetband.

Discography
Bingo-Master's Break-Out – The Fall (1978)
New Love Songs 7" EP – Passage (Object Music, 1978)
Future 7" EP – Contact (Object Music, 1979)

See also
 List of The Fall members

References

External links
 The website of Tony Friel

1958 births
English rock bass guitarists
Male bass guitarists
English rock guitarists
English male guitarists
The Fall (band) members
People from Birkenhead
Living people